Eric Kalala Nsantu is a Congolese transportation and logistics executive who has been the Chief Executive Officer of Bolloré Transport & Logistics in the Democratic Republic of the Congo since January 2019.

Education 
Kalala received his university degree in business engineering at the Administration and Management Institute of Université catholique de Louvain from 1997 until 2002. Thereafter, he attended the prestigious HEC Paris for his master's degree in International Management, completing the course in 2003. Additionally, Kalala is also a graduate of the General Management Program diploma from Harvard Business School, which he completed in 2016.

Career
Kalala began his career at Bollore in 2003. After holding various positions in the Finance and Operations Division, in 2012, he was promoted as head of the Katanga region, the Democratic Republic of Congo's richest province that produces 60 percent of the annual government revenue.

In January 2019, Kalala was promoted to the position of Chief Executive Officer, replacing Yves Debiesme who retired. Since the beginning of his tenure, Kalala has created over 100 jobs within the company, oversaw a steady increase in revenue in one of the most important landlocked countries in Africa, and expanded annual exports to over 400,000 tons of goods per year.

In August 2021, Éric Kalala Nsantu was appointed CEO of Bolloré Transport & Logistics.

Personal life 
Kalala is married to Nadine Tshiamala since 2005. Together, they have three children and currently reside in Kinshasa, in the neighborhood of Ngaliema.

References

Living people
1979 births
Democratic Republic of the Congo businesspeople
HEC Paris alumni
Harvard Business School alumni
Université catholique de Louvain alumni
21st-century Democratic Republic of the Congo people